In machine learning, semantic analysis of a corpus is the task of building structures that approximate concepts from a large set of documents. It generally does not involve prior semantic understanding of the documents. A metalanguage based on predicate logic can analyze the speech of humans. Another strategy to understand the semantics of a text is symbol grounding. If language is grounded, it is equal to recognizing a machine readable meaning. For the restricted domain of spatial analysis, a computer based language understanding system was demonstrated.

Latent semantic analysis (sometimes latent semantic indexing), is a class of techniques where documents are represented as vectors in term space. A prominent example is PLSI.

Latent Dirichlet allocation involves attributing document terms to topics.

n-grams and hidden Markov models work by representing the term stream as a Markov chain where each term is derived from the few terms before it.

See also 
 Explicit semantic analysis
 Information extraction
 Semantic similarity
 
 Ontology learning

References 

Machine learning